Wilsoniana is a genus of plant-parasitic oomycetes segregated from Albugo. The name is in honor of the American mycologist G.W.Wilson

References

Water mould genera
Albuginaceae